Paul R. Feeney is an American politician from the commonwealth of Massachusetts. He serves in the Massachusetts Senate from the Bristol and Norfolk district.

Feeney graduated from Don Bosco Technical High School. He worked for Verizon as an office technician, and served as the legislative director for the International Brotherhood of Electrical Workers. He served on the board of selectmen for Foxboro, Massachusetts, from 2007 though 2010. Feeney has also served as chief of staff for Jim Timilty and as labor director for Stephen F. Lynch's campaign for the United States Senate in the 2013 special election. Feeney was state director of Connecticut and Massachusetts for the Bernie Sanders 2016 presidential campaign.

When Timilty resigned in 2017, Feeney ran in the special election to succeed him, defeating Republican Jacob Ventura. Feeney defeated Ventura in the 2018 general election.

Electoral History

In 2020 Feeney went unopposed in the Democratic Primary and the General Election.

See also
 2019–2020 Massachusetts legislature
 2021–2022 Massachusetts legislature

References

External links

Living people
People from Foxborough, Massachusetts
Democratic Party Massachusetts state senators
Political chiefs of staff
Don Bosco Technical High School (Boston) alumni
21st-century American politicians
1978 births